Dharmpal Singh Gupta (21 August 1925 – 4 September 1997) was an Indian politician who was a member of the 9th Lok Sabha. He represented the Rajnandgaon constituency of Chhattisgarh and was a member of the Bharatiya Janata Party political party.

Gupta was born in Durg District, Madhya Pradesh on 21 August 1925. He died in Mumbai on 4 September 1997, at the age of 72.

References

1925 births
1997 deaths
India MPs 1989–1991
Bharatiya Janata Party politicians from Chhattisgarh
Lok Sabha members from Chhattisgarh
People from Rajnandgaon
Indian National Congress politicians
Madhya Pradesh MLAs 1967–1972
Madhya Pradesh MLAs 1977–1980